The Gillette House in Houston, Texas is a one-story frame cottage with a hipped roof that was built in 1904 in the Houston Heights area.  James Gillette, the original owner, was an attorney.  It was listed on the National Register of Historic Places in 1984.

It was deemed notable as a "good example of a simple-type cottage built in early years of [Houston] Heights...for the rising middle-class population".  There is Queen Anne influence in its architecture.

Gallery

References

National Register of Historic Places in Houston
Houses on the National Register of Historic Places in Texas
Queen Anne architecture in Texas
Houses completed in 1904
Houses in Houston
1904 establishments in Texas